Centinex  is  a Swedish death metal band formed in 1990. They disbanded on 12 April 2006. They were scheduled to perform their final concert at an already booked show in Eskilstuna, Sweden, on 13 May 2006, but later cancelled. Some of the members went on to form the death metal band Demonical. In January 2014, Centinex was reformed.

Band members

Current line-up 
Martin Schulman – bass
Jörgen Kristensen – guitar
Florian Rehn – drums
Henka Andersson – vocals

Former members 
Alexander Högbom – vocals
Erik Håkansson- vocals (1992)
Mattias Lamppu – vocals (1990–1998)
Johan Jansson – vocals (1998–2006)
Lasse Eriksson – vocals
Andreas Evaldsson – guitar (1990–1998)
Kenneth Wiklund – guitar (1997–2001)
Jonas Kjellgren – guitar (1998–2006)
Daniel Fägnefors – guitar (1993)
Joakim Gustavsson – drums (1992–1993)
Kennet Englund – drums (2000–2003) (Uncanny)
Ronnie Bergerståhl – drums (2003–2006)
Fred Estby – drums (Dismember, Carnage, Terra Firma)

Discography

Studio albums 
 Subconscious Lobotomy  (1992)
 Malleus Maleficarum (1996)
 Reflections (1997)
 Reborn Through Flames (1998)
 Hellbrigade (2000)
 Diabolical Desolation  (2002)
 Decadence – Prophecies of Cosmic Chaos (2004)
 World Declension (2005)
 Redeeming Filth (2014)
 Doomsday Rituals (2016)
 Death in Pieces (2020)

Compilations 
 Bloodhunt / Reborn Through Flames (2003)

Demos, singles and EPs 
 End of Life (demo, 1991)
 Under the Blackened Sky (demo, 1993)
 Transcend the Dark Chaos (EP, 1994)
 Sorrow of the Burning Wasteland/Diabolical Ceremonies (split, 1995)
 Shadowland (single, 1998)
 Bloodhunt (EP, 1999)
 "Apocalyptic Armageddon" (single, 2001)
 Hail Germania (split, 2003)
 "Deathlike Recollections" (single, 2003)
 Live Devastation (EP, 2004)
 Teutonische Invasion (EP, 2013)
 The Pestilence (EP, 2022)

References 

Swedish melodic death metal musical groups
Musical groups established in 1990
Musical groups disestablished in 2006
Musical groups reestablished in 2014
Musical quintets